Football Club Camerhogne is a Grenadian football club based in Gouyave. The club plays in the GFA Premier League, the highest tier of football on the island.

The club was known as Gouyave Football Club until 2017.

Squad

References

External links 
 
 FC Camerhogne at GFA Premier League

Camerhogne Football
Association football clubs established in 2013